Samayasangili is a village in Namakkal district in the Indian state of Tamil Nadu. It consists of five sub villages includes Samayasangilli, Thottipalayam Pudur, Thottipalayam Palaiyur, Sengutaipalayam, Seerampalayam.

Geography
The Village located at the Bank of river cauvery and it is the border of Namakkal district.

Demographics

Population 
 census, Samayasangili had a population of 4323.

Economy 
The main occupation in the village is agriculture. The cultivation generally depends on monsoon rains, wells and tanks. Nearly 90 percent of the cultivated area is under food crops. The principal cereal crops of this district are paddy, cholam. Among pulses, the major crops are redgram, blackgram, greengram and horsegram. Of the commercial crops, sugarcane, Turmeric and tapioca are some of the important crops.

Bhavani Kattalai Barrage I Hydel Power Project is in this village generating electricity under TNEB.

Transport

By Air

By Rail

By Road  
Samayasangilli is connected by roads to nearer city Erode and town Pallipalayam and komarapalayam.
It is 8 km from Erode and Pallipalayam and 10 km from komarapalayam.

Education 
Elementary School Samayasangilli, and Sengutaipalayam

References

[Map View: http://goo.gl/maps/yhyMa]

Cities and towns in Namakkal district